"Where Can I Find Love'" is a 1997 song recorded by Italian electronic music group Livin' Joy and Tameko Star, released as the fourth single from their only album, Don't Stop Movin (1996). It peaked at number 12 in the UK, on both the UK Singles Chart and the UK Dance Chart. Additionally, it was a Top 20 hit also in Italy and Scotland. On the Eurochart Hot 100, it reached number 45 in April 1997. Outside Europe, the single was successful in Israel, peaking at number nine, and it also charted in Australia, peaking at number 142. Lyrically, the track focusses on the struggles to find true love. This was further fleshed out with the accompanying music video featuring singer Tameko Star walking around in a nightclub, bumping into various men who catch her attention. Each man is then shown to have an 'issue' which leaves Star disappointed.

Critical reception
British magazine Music Week rated the song four out of five, writing, "Livin' Joy's familiar formula – fast-moving, slick and funky – is set to provide another huge club and chart hit. Quality stuff."

Track listing
 12", Italy
A1. "Where Can I Find Love" (Original Extended Mix) – 5:11
A2. "Where Can I Find Love" (Mark!s Anybody Dub) – 9:40
B1. "Where Can I Find Love" (A-Manetta Club Mix) – 6:06
B2. "Where Can I Find Love" (Mark!s Hutch Vocal) – 9:07

 CD single, UK
"Where Can I Find Love" (Radio Mix) – 3:50
"Where Can I Find Love" (Mark!s Hutch Vocal) – 9:07
"Where Can I Find Love" (Original Extended Mix) – 5:11
"Where Can I Find Love" (Mark!s Anybody Dub) – 9:40
"Where Can I Find Love" (G. Piano Mix) – 3:06
"Where Can I Find Love" (A-Manetta Club Mix) – 6:06

 Cassette single, UK
A1. "Where Can I Find Love" (Radio Mix) – 3:50
A2. "Where Can I Find Love" (A-Manetta Radio Edit Mix) – 4:18
B1. "Where Can I Find Love" (Radio Mix) – 3:50
B2. "Where Can I Find Love" (A-Manetta Radio Edit Mix) – 4:18

Charts

References

 

1997 singles
1997 songs
Livin' Joy songs
MCA Records singles
English-language Italian songs